Events in Italy in 1989:

Incumbents
 President of Italy: Francesco Cossiga
 Prime Minister of Italy: Ciriaco De Mita until 22 July; after 22 July Giulio Andreotti

Events
 21 February - The Sanremo Music Festival 1989 opens at the Teatro Ariston in Sanremo.
 24 May - AC Milan win the European Cup for the third time with a 4–0 victory over Romanian league champions Steaua Burcharest of in Barcelona.
 18 June - The third elections for the European Parliament are held. A non-binding advisory referendum is held on the same day to re-affirm popular support for the process of European integration.
Date unknown
VeniceArrhythmias, a biannual international workshop is founded.

Sport
 1989 Supercoppa Italiana
 1989 Torneo di Viareggio
 1989 Italian Grand Prix
 1989 San Marino Grand Prix
 1989 Italian motorcycle Grand Prix
 1989 Giro d'Italia
 1989 Italian Open (tennis)

Film

 53rd Venice International Film Festival

Births
18 March - Francesco Checcucci, footballer
11 May - Gianluigi Bianco, footballer
22 May - Aurora Ruffino, actress
9 August - Stefano Okaka, footballer

Deaths
30 April - Sergio Leone, film director (b. 1929)
2 October - Vittorio Caprioli, actor, director and screenwriter (b. 1921)

References

 
Italy
Years of the 20th century in Italy
1990s in Italy
Italy